Marion Farissier (born 23 November 1991 in Écully) is a French diver. She competed in the 3 m springboard event at the 2012 Summer Olympics.  She also participated at 2 World Championships (2011 and 2013) and 2 European Championships (2010 and 2012).

References

1991 births
Living people
French female divers
Divers at the 2012 Summer Olympics
Olympic divers of France
People from Écully
Sportspeople from Lyon Metropolis
21st-century French women